The Armed Forces Discipline Act 2000 is an Act of the Parliament of the United Kingdom. It amends the Army Act 1955, the Air Force Act 1955 and the Naval Discipline Act 1957 in relation to custody, the right to elect court-martial trial and appeals against findings made or punishments awarded on summary dealing or summary trial; and for connected purposes.

See also
 Armed Forces Act

United Kingdom Acts of Parliament 2000
United Kingdom military law